The Zastava M87  is a heavy machine gun produced by Zastava Arms in Yugoslavia and later Serbia. The M87 is a copy of the Soviet NSV heavy machine gun. It is intended for anti-aircraft duties, but it also used for action against ground and maritime targets at long distances.

Users

Former users

See also
Zastava M84
Zastava M02 Coyote

External links
Official website of Zastava Arms
Zastava M87
Zastava M87 - Naval
Belt filter 12.7
Zastava M02 Coyote

12.7×108 mm machine guns
Machine guns of Yugoslavia
Machine guns of Serbia
Zastava Arms
Heavy machine guns
Military equipment introduced in the 1980s